Jaswant Singh II, GCSI, (1838 – 11 October 1895) was Maharaja of Jodhpur from 4 February 1873 – 11 October 1895.

Birth
He was born in 1838 at Ahmadnagar in Gujarat and was eldest son of Takht Singh.

Marriage
He had eight wives, of which the first–the daughter of the Jam Sahib of Nawanagar, Puariji–was chief consort.

Accession
He acceded to the throne of Jodhpur in 1873 upon death of his father, Takht Singh,

Reign

The reign of Jaswant Singh II was marked with remarkable prosperity and reforms and development works. He established Courts of Justice, introduced system of revenue settlement and reorganizing all the state departments. Further, he developed infrastructure of the state by introducing telegraphs, railways (Jodhpur State Railway), and developing roads. He formed Imperial Service Cavalry Corps, which later rendered active service in European War. He was honoured and created the Knight Grand Commander of the Most Exalted Order of the Star of India in 1875.

Swami Dayananda incident
Jaswant Singh had invited Swami Dayananda as he was influenced by his ideas. But the tragedy occurred when Dayananda was poisoned on 29 September 1883, when he was the royal guest of Jaswant Singh II, by Dayananda's own cook, who had conspired with a court dancer. The Maharaja was quick to arrange the services of a doctor and arranged for Swamiji to be sent to Mount Abu upon the advice of Residency.

Death
He died 11 October 1895 and was succeeded by his middle son Sardar Singh.

Jaswant Thada 

The Jaswant Thada is an architectural landmark located in Jodhpur. It is a white marble memorial built by Sardar Singh in 1899 in memory of 
Maharaja Jaswant Singh II.

References

 
 
 
 
 

1838 births
1895 deaths
Rajasthani people
Knights Grand Commander of the Order of the Star of India
Jsswant II
Indian knights